The 2014 V.League 2 (referred to as Kienlongbank V.League 2 for sponsorship reasons) is the 20th season of Vietnam's second tier professional football league, which began on 15 March 2014 and finished on 28 June 2014.

Changes from last season

Team changes
The following teams have changed division since the 2013 season.

To V.League 2
Promoted from Second Division
 Đắk Lắk
 TP.Hồ Chí Minh
 Huế
 Sanna Khánh Hòa
 XM Fico Tây Ninh

From V.League 2
Relegated to Second Division
 TDC Bình Dương
Promoted to V.League 1
 Hùng Vương An Giang
 QNK Quảng Nam
 Than Quảng Ninh
Folded
 Bình Định

Rule changes
The Vietnam Football Federation passed a resolution on December 5 that allows the champion and runners-up of the 2014 campaign to gain promotion to the 2015 V.League 1. The resolution also called for only one club to face relegation to the 2015 Vietnamese Second Division.

Due to the match fixing scandal and withdrawal of Vissai Ninh Bình from the 2014 V.League 1, it was decided that the third-place club in the V.League 2 would face the twelfth-place of the V.League 1 in a play-off match for the right to play in the V.League 1 next season.

Teams
Of the 8 participating teams, three remain following the 2013 V.League 2. They are joined by five teams promoted from the 2013 Vietnamese Second Division. No clubs from the 2013 V.League 1 were relegated. Bình Định failed to apply for the 2013 season by the application deadline.

League table

Results

Summary

Season statistics

Top scorers

References

External links
 Official Page

Second level Vietnamese football league seasons
2
Viet
Viet